is a series of puzzle-platform games developed by HAL Laboratory and published by Nintendo. The series centres around Qbby, a square-shaped character who can produce a string of connected boxes. The boxes are used to overcome obstacles in stages that Qbby must be guided through. The first game, BoxBoy!, released on January 14, 2015, in Japan on the Nintendo 3DS. Its sequel, BoxBoxBoy!, was released for the Nintendo 3DS in 2016, with a third game, Bye-Bye BoxBoy!, in 2017. A physical compilation of the first three games, HakoBoy! Hakozume Box, was released in Japan. A fourth installment, BoxBoy! + BoxGirl!, was released for the Nintendo Switch in April 2019.

Games

BoxBoy!

BoxBoy! was developed by Japanese video game company HAL Laboratory. It was a small experimental project in development while the studio was working on Kirby: Triple Deluxe and Kirby and the Rainbow Curse. The project plan for BoxBoy! was conceived in July 2011 by employee Yasuhiro Mukae, who would later serve as the game's director. The game revolves around Qbby, a character who can produce boxes and use them to solve puzzles, move around, and press switches.

BoxBoxBoy!

 is a puzzle-platform game developed by HAL Laboratory and published by Nintendo for the Nintendo 3DS handheld game console. The game was released in Japan in January 2016, and in other territories in June 2016. This game introduces the concept of being able to summon two sets of boxes at once.

Bye-Bye BoxBoy!

Bye-Bye BoxBoy! is a puzzle-platform game developed by HAL Laboratory and published by Nintendo for the Nintendo 3DS handheld console. The game was released worldwide in 2017. It features boxes with special properties, such as exploding and warping, and Qbabies that Qbby must escort to the end of a level.

BoxBoy! + BoxGirl!

 is a puzzle-platform game developed by HAL Laboratory and published by Nintendo. It is the fourth game in the BoxBoy! series and first to be released on the Nintendo Switch. BoxBoy! + BoxGirl! features a two-player multiplayer mode for the first time in the series, with it being praised by critics. The game was released worldwide for the Nintendo Switch exclusively via Nintendo eShop on April 26, 2019.

Gameplay

Reception

The BoxBoy! series has received generally favourable reviews from critics according to review aggregator website Metacritic.

Notes

References

HAL Laboratory games
Cooperative video games
Multiplayer and single-player video games
Nintendo franchises
Platform games
Puzzle video games
Puzzle-platform games
Video games developed in Japan
Video games about children
BoxBoy!
Video game franchises introduced in 2015